Paolo Lega (1868–1896), also known as Marat,  was an Italian anarchist who attempted to assassinate the prime minister, Francesco Crispi.

References

Further reading 

 
 
 
 
 

1868 births
1896 deaths
Italian anarchists